Richard Lazarus (1922–2002) was an American psychologist

Richard Lazarus may also refer to:
Richard Lazarus (law professor)
Professor Richard Lazarus, Doctor Who villain